Weracoba Creek is a stream in the U.S. state of Georgia.

Weracoba is a name derived from a Native American language meaning "big water".

References

Rivers of Georgia (U.S. state)
Rivers of Muscogee County, Georgia